In 1950, Lancia introduced one of the world's first production V6 engines in the Lancia Aurelia. The engine was the work of Francesco De Virgilio and was developed to solve the vibration problems Lancia had experienced with its V4 engines. This was achieved by setting the vee angle to 60 degrees. It remained in production through 1970. Lancia used V6 engines in road and sports cars, the D20 had a 60 degree quad cam V6 2962 cc  engine and the D24 3300 cc V6 engine.

Aurelia

The first-generation Aurelia engines were produced from 1950 through 1967.

1800

The  1800 was the first V6.

 1950 Lancia Aurelia

2000

 1951-1952 Lancia Aurelia

2300

A  version was also produced.

2500

The largest of the original Aurelia engines was the  2500 introduced in 1953.  It was still undersquare at  bore and stroke.

 1953-1957 Lancia Aurelia

Flaminia

The engine's severe undersquare design was addressed for the 1957 Flaminia version. This lasted in production through 1970.

2500

The new engine displaced  from a much less undersquare  bore and stroke.

 1957-1970 Lancia Flaminia

2800

The final version was the  engine.

 1957-1970 Lancia Flaminia

Later V6-engined Lancias

Later Lancias were powered by V6 engines designed by other manufacturers, with the Ferrari Dino V6 powering the Stratos, the PRV V6 powering early Themas, the Alfa Romeo Busso V6 powering later versions of the Thema, and versions of the Kappa and Thesis and the Chrysler Pentastar V6 in the badge-engineered 300C-based Thema.

Notes 

V6
Gasoline engines by model
Products introduced in 1950
V6 engines